Turmantas railway station is a railway passenger and cargo station located in Turmantas town, Zarasai district, Lithuania, on the Lithuanian-Latvian border, at the end of railway line Vilnius - Turmantas. Closest railway stations are situated in Visaginas to the south and Daugavpils (Lithuanian: Daugpilis) to the north.

The railway station serves Turmantas town. Currently it is a terminus for a train passenger service Vilnius - Ignalina - Turmantas - Vilnius. In 2015 a train Vilnius - Daugavpils - St. Petersburg was canceled, which was the oldest train service in Lithuania since the opening of the Saint Petersburg-Warsaw railway line, also passing through this station. From 2018 until 2021 a route Vilnius - Turmantas - Daugavpils was also stopping at this station.

Turmantas's coat of arms features two steel horses, which are the symbols of railways.

History

Turmantas railway station was built as a fourth-class railway station and opened in 1862 while building Saint Petersburg-Warsaw railway. It was built between Dūkštas and Kalkuny (Russian: Калкуны, currently named Daugavpils) stations, approximately half-way on the railway line. During the tsarist era the station was called Novoaleksandrovsk (Russian: Новоалександровск, currently named Zarasai), then Turmont. During World War II retaliating Nazi army, among other stations on this railway line, destroyed the passenger hall. It was rebuilt between 1945 and 1960.

References

1861 establishments in the Russian Empire
Railway stations in Lithuania
Railway stations in the Russian Empire opened in 1862